The 1990 Refuge Assurance Cup was the third season of the Refuge Assurance Cup, for the most successful teams in the Sunday League. It was an English limited overs county cricket tournament which was held between 5 and 16 September 1990. The tournament was won by Middlesex who defeated Derbyshire by 5 wickets in the final at Edgbaston, Birmingham.

Format
The cup was an end-of-season affair. The counties finishing in the top four of the 1990 Refuge Assurance League competed in the semi-finals. The top two teams were drawn at home. Winners from the semi-finals then went on to the final at Edgbaston which was held on 16 September 1990.

Semi-finals

Final

The attendance at the final was 7,212.

External links

CricketArchive tournament page 

Pro40
Refuge Assurance Cup